Kruté radosti ("Cruel Joys") is a 2002 Slovak-Czech comedy, starring Tatiana Pauhofová.  The film directed by Juraj Nvota received several awards. Amongst others, at Art Film Fest, Festival of Slovak Film Cran-Gevrier, while Ondřej Vetchý earned an award as the Best Male Actor at the IFF Faces of Love in Moscow, Russia.

Cast
Tatiana Pauhofová as Valentína
Ondřej Vetchý as Karel
Lukáš Latinák
Vladimír Hajdu as Gabriel
Csongor Kassai as Lajoš
Milan Mikulčík as Martin
Anna Šišková as Helena
Július Satinský as Helena's uncle
Szidi Tobias as Ilona
Zuzana Kanócz
Anikó Vargová
Attila Mokos
Emília Došeková
František Zvarík
Ján Kroner
Lucia Gažiová
Martin Nahálka
Milan Ondrík
Zuzana Haasová

Additional credits
Ondrej Trojan - co-producer
 Jana Garajová - assistant director
 Radim Hladík Jr - sound
 Martin Hub - stunts
 Filip Majer - assistant camera
 Peter Čanecký - art director
 Mona Hafsahl - costume designer

Awards

See also
List of Slovak submissions for the Academy Award for Best Foreign Language Film

References

External links

2002 films
Slovak-language films
Czech comedy films
2000s Czech-language films
Slovak comedy films
2002 comedy films
2002 multilingual films
Slovak multilingual films
Czech multilingual films